HEC Montréal is a bilingual public business school located in Montreal, Quebec, Canada. Founded in 1907, HEC Montréal is the graduate business school of the Université de Montréal and known as the first established school of management in Canada.

HEC Montréal offers undergraduate, graduate and post-graduate programs including Bachelor of Business Administration (BBA), Master of Science in Administration (MSc), Master of Management (MM), Master of Business Administration (MBA) and PhD in Administration, in addition to a joint Executive MBA program with McGill University.

HEC Montréal was ranked first by value among Canada's business schools for its MBA program by Canadian Business in 2016, 17th worldwide among non-US business schools by Forbes and among Top 30 international business schools by Bloomberg BusinessWeek in 2015.

History 
HEC Montréal was founded in 1907 by the Board of Trade of Metropolitan Montreal. As of 2017, the school had over 87,900 alumni. Since 1921, the HEC Montréal Alumni Association represents the school's graduates throughout Canada and the rest of the world.

List of directors

Programs and trainings 
HEC Montréal offers undergraduate, graduate and postgraduate programs, along with executive training and a platform for online courses.

Programs

Bachelor of Business Administration (BBA)
HEC Montréal's BBA is offered in three different formats:

 French: core courses in French, followed by options which may be in French, English or Spanish. A semester abroad is optional but encouraged.
 Bilingual: core courses in French and in English, followed by options in French, English or Spanish. A semester abroad (or Campus Abroad program) is optional but encouraged.
 Trilingual: core courses in French, Spanish and English, followed by a mandatory semester abroad (or Campus Abroad program), and options in any of the three.

The degree lasts three years for students from the province of Quebec (as they have completed a mandatory two-year generalist college education before attending the school), or four years for foreign students, who need to take a preparatory year consisting of classes in calculus, algebra, languages and an introduction to the business world and economics. The preparatory year may only be taken in French.

After a series of core courses (microeconomics, macroeconomics, sociology, statistics, math, accounting, etc.) students can choose to take a specialization, a joint major (choice of two specializations) or a personalized major.

Over 450 students attend exchanges in some of the 127 partner universities in 40 countries (Australia, Argentina, Brazil, France, Germany, UK, Spain, Hong Kong, Singapore, Thailand, China, Japan, Sweden, etc.) and another 450+ students come from these universities to HEC Montreal.

International students make up around 35%  of the student population; the most common origins are Europe, Northern Africa and Latin America.

Professional Certificates
Certificates are professional development programs lasting at least one year. They are diplomas in a specialized field of management, worth 30 North American university credits. They are only offered in French. HEC Montréal offers more than 25 certificates:

Accounting Studies

 Certificat en comptabilité professionnelle (FR)
 Certificat en gestion comptable des organisations (FR)
 Certificat personnalisé en comptabilité (FR)

Decision Sciences

 Certificat en analytique d'affaires (FR)

Entrepreneurship and Innovation

 Certificat en entrepreneuriat et création d'entreprise (FR)
 Certificat en gestion de l'innovation

Finance

 Certificat en finance de marché
 Certificat en finance d'entreprise
 Certificat en planification financière personelle

Human Resources

 Certificat en developpement organisationnel
 Certificat en gestion de la coopération et des conflits en milieu de travail
 Certificat en gestion des ressources humaines

Information Technologies

 Certificat en analyse d'affaires - technologies de l'information
 Certificat en analyse de la sécurité de l'information et des systèmes

International

 Certificat en amélioration des processus et de la qualité
 Certificat en gestion de la chaîne logistique

Management

 Certificat personnalisé en administration
 Certificat en gestion d'entreprises
 Certificat en gestion des projects
 Certificat en leadership organnisationnel 
 Certificat en supervision

Marketing

 Certificat en gestion du marketing
 Certificat en vente relationnelle

Sustainable Development Management

 Certificat en developpement durable

Master of Science in Administration (MSc)
The MSc degree usually lasts between 18 and 24 months, and it can be taken with a research thesis or with a supervised project and additional courses. Candidates should hold a bachelor's degree (Master 2/Bac +5 for French candidates, exceptionally students with a Master 1/Bac +4 can be admitted, but not with just a Licence) in a field such as management, mathematics, engineering, psychology, economics or another field. Most students need to complete a few additional "preparation courses" from the final year of the BBA in order to prepare for their option.

Compared to most European master's degrees in business schools, the degree at HEC Montréal tends to be more focused on research and detailed understanding of the theory, and can be both a preparation for jobs as an analyst/consultant, as well as a preparation to pursue a PhD.

MSc students at HEC Montréal have a choice of 2 specializations in English, and 18 in French. For the specializations offered in English, students enroll in the thesis stream, consisting of seven courses and a major research paper.

 Specializations in French: Affaires internationales, Analytique d'affaires, Comptabilité professionnelle, Contrôle de gestion, Développement organisationnel, Économie appliquée, Économie financière appliquée, Finance, Gestion des opérations, Gestion des ressources humaines, Gestions en contexte d'innovations sociales, Ingénierie financière, Intelligence d'affaires, Logistique internationale, Management, Marketing, Stratégie, Technologies de l'information
 Specializations in English: Global Supply Chain Management, International Business

Students enrolled in the Global Supply Chain Management may enroll in a double-degree with the Melbourne Business School: after one year spent at each institution, they obtain both the M.Sc. Global Supply Chain Management and a M.Sc. in International Business from Melbourne.

Professional Masters
HEC Montréal offered five professional Masters:

 Maîtrise en droit, option fiscalité (LL. M.) (Master of Laws, Taxation option)
 Maîtrise en management (M.M.) des entreprises culturelles (Master of Management in Cultural Enterprises)
 Maîtrise en management (M.M.) et développement durable (Master of Management in Sustainable Development)
 Maîtrise ès sciences (M.Sc.) en commerce électronique (Master of Science (MSc) in Electronic Commerce)
 Masters in International Arts Management (in English)
The Masters in International Arts Management is jointly delivered by HEC Montréal, SDA Bocconi (Milan) and Southern Methodist University (Dallas). Students begin at SMU, studying international cultural policy, law and the economics of arts markets. They then continue at HEC Montréal, learning about project management, arts branding, marketing for cultural industries and other aspects of the arts business. Finally, they study strategy for the arts business and complete a masters thesis at SDA Bocconi. The program lasts one year.

D.E.S.S. (Graduate Studies Diploma)
The school also offers one-year graduate diplomas called D.E.S.S (diplômes d'études supérieures spécialisées) in French, for people who already hold a bachelor's degree and a small amount of work experience. Compared to the Master of Science degrees, the D.E.S.S tend to be more applied and focused on professional skills, whereas the MSc combines these with an extensive study of theory.
The D.E.S.S are offered in E-Business, Financial Professions, Management, Management and Sustainable Development, Management of Cultural Organizations, Marketing Communication,  Professional Accounting – CPA, Supply Chain Management, Human Resources and Taxation.

Two D.E.S.S. are offered overseas:
 D.E.S.S. in Management of the Energy Sector, offered together with the Sichuan Electric Power Corporation in China, entirely in English, exclusively for candidates who hold a bachelor's degree, have 2+ years of experience in the energy sector, and are sponsored by their employer. In 2014, the degree was also offered in Brazzaville (Congo) with support from the Congolese government.
 D.E.S.S. in Management, offered in Lebanon, taught in the facilities of USEK (Université du Saint-Esprit de Kaslik). Students can take additional credits after finishing the D.E.S.S. and obtain an MBA from USEK as well.

Short Graduate Programs
The HEC Montréal Short Graduate Programs (in French only) focus on practical training and developing skills specific to a profession or field. These programs consist of 15 credits.
 Microprogramme en amélioration de la performance des processus du système de santé et des services sociaux (Process Performance Improvement – Health and Social Services System)
 Microprogramme en analytique d'affaires – Énergie (Business Analytics – Energy Sector)
 Microprogramme en expérience utilisateur dans un contexte d'affaires (User Experience)
 Microprogramme en exploitation de données en intelligence d'affaires (Business Intelligence Data Applications)
 Microprogramme en gestion – Entrepreneuriat/Introduction or Avancé (Management – Entrepreneurship/Introduction or Advanced)
 Microprogramme en gestion de la chaîne logistique (Supply Chain Management)
 Microprogramme en gestion des arts et de la culture (Arts and Culture Management)
 Microprogramme en gestion des ressources humaines (Human Resources)
 Microprogramme en gestion et développement durable (Management and Sustainable Development)
 Microprogramme en internationalisation des affaires (Business Internationalisation)

Professional Education Program
The CPA Canada Professional Education Program (PEP) is offered by the Ordre des comptables professionnels agréés du Québec (CPA) in partnership with HEC Montréal and the Faculté des sciences de l’administration at Université Laval (FSA ULaval). It is a graduate-level university course lasting 16 to 24 months, and equips students to write the Common Final Examination to become CPAs. They can study part-time while continuing to work.

Executive Education
The École des dirigeants HEC Montréal offers five types of programs:
 Degree programs (MBA, EMBA McGill-HEC Montréal, MBA-ITC)
 Qualifying programs (MBA essentials, Parcours Experts series)
 Short training programs on a range of themes
 Customized training programs
 Customized lectures and support programs
 MBA: The school offers MBA programs in French (full and part-time) as well as in English (full-time).
 EMBA: The Executive MBA Program is delivered for executives with over 15 years of experience, in collaboration with McGill University.
 MBA-ITC: Offered in collaboration with Polytechnique Montréal, the MBA-ITC is exclusively for engineers.
Postgraduate Programs
 PhD: HEC Montréal offers a bilingual PhD program jointly with three other Montreal universities (McGill, Concordia and UQAM).  The School PhD program offers 10 specializations: Accounting Studies, Applied Economics, Finance, Human Resources Management, Information Technologies, International Business, Logistics and Operations Management, Management, Management Sciences, Marketing. 
Platform of online courses

EDUlib is an online platform of free courses available globally. Polytechnique Montréal and Université de Montréal are teaming up with HEC Montréal to produce and distribute open courses on health, educational studies, sciences, engineering, management and other subject matters.

 Reputation 

CANADIAN BUSINESS

 Value Rank :1 among business schools in Canada (2016) 
 Reputation Rank :3 among business schools in Canada (2017) 
FORBES

 11th worldwide in the non-USA business schools listing in 2015.

BLOOMBERG BUSINESSWEEK

 Top 30 International Business Schools in 2015.

THE ECONOMIST

 Top 100 Business Schools in 2015.

QS GLOBAL 200 BUSINESS SCHOOLS REPORT

 Top 25 Most Targeted Business School Worldwide in 2015.

INTERNATIONAL NEW YORK TIMES

  The Emerging, published in the International New York Times, placed HEC Montréal as the 47th worldwide in 2015.

 Buildings 

 The Decelles Campus: 1970–today 

In 1970, Robert Bourassa inaugurated the Decelles building of HEC Montreal, named "the School on the mountain". The students sometimes use the expression "Bunker" to refer to it due to the use of concrete for the exterior facade and the absence of windows.

In 1976, the PhD program was proposed, in collaboration with McGill University. The MSc program was created the same year.

Under the presidency of Pierre Harvey (HEC 1948), the 75th anniversary of the School was celebrated in 1982 with René Lévesque, then Premier of Quebec, in attendance. The 7th floor of the Decelles building was inaugurated on this occasion.

In 2012, the entire building was renovated.

 The Côte-Sainte-Catherine Campus: 1996–today 

HEC Montréal's main building was constructed in 1996 and has since won an award for "institutional architecture". The building was designed by Dan Hanganu and Jodoin, Lamarre, Pratte and Associates and is situated at 3000 Côte-Sainte-Catherine (Map), next to the Université-de-Montréal Metro Station. The former main building at 5255 Decelles (Map) is now used as a secondary building. The first building used by HEC Montréal was located in downtown Montreal but is no longer used by the school.

The trading floor of the School was inaugurated in 1997: it was conceived to be usable in case the Montreal Stock Exchange ever had major engineering problems. Now known as the Salle des marchés Financière Banque Nationale, it was renovated in 2007 in order to remain technologically current.

Noted alumni and faculty
Alumni
Antoine Arnault: CEO of Berluti
Stéphane Bédard: Québec Politician and lawyer
Jean Campeau: ex-CEO of the Caisse de dépôt et placement du Québec and co-chairman of the Commission on the Political and Constitutional Future of Quebec 
Verònica Canals i Riba: Minister of Tourism of Andorra since May 22, 2019
Louis R. Chênevert: ex-CEO of United Technologies Corporation
Armando Torres Chibrás: Orchestra conductor in the National Symphony Orchestra of Mexico
Caroline Codsi: President and founder of Women in Governance'', and Board Member of Montreal Museum of Fine Arts
François Desjardins: CEO of B2B Bank
Jérôme J. Dufourg: ex-CEO, FC Talanta
Robert Dutton  ex-CEO of Rona, Inc.
Anne-Marie Gélinas: Film producer and CEO of Emafilms
Marie Gibeau: Québec Politician
Léo-Paul Lauzon: Professor of accounting at the UQAM and social activist
François Legault: Current Premier of Québec and Founder of Air Transat
Rémi Marcoux: Chairman of TC Transcontinental
Pauline Marois: Former Premier of Québec (30th)
Daniel Paillé: Québec Politician, Economist and former Minister
Jacques Parizeau: Former Premier of Québec (26th)
Charles-Albert Poissant: Philanthrope and Canadian Businessman
Martine Ouellet: Québec Politician
Thierry Vandal: CEO of Hydro-Quebec
Samir Trabelsi: CPA Ontario Distinguished Scholar and Professor of Governance and Accounting at Goodman School of Business

Faculty
Ann Langley
Gilbert Laporte
Danny Miller (economist)

See also 

 Higher education in Quebec
 List of universities in Quebec
 Canadian Interuniversity Sport
 Canadian government scientific research organizations
 Canadian university scientific research organizations
 Canadian industrial research and development organizations

References

External links 

 
 HEC Montréal on YouTube
 HEC Montréal on Flickr

Business schools in Canada
Educational institutions established in 1907
Université de Montréal
Universities and colleges in Montreal
Côte-des-Neiges–Notre-Dame-de-Grâce
Dan Hanganu buildings
1907 establishments in Quebec